Öküz Mehmed Pasha was a 17th-century Ottman grand vizier. Buildings bearing his name are:

 Öküz Mehmed Pasha Caravanserai in Kuşadası, Aydın Province, Turkey
 Öküz Mehmet Pasha Complex in Ulukışla, Niğde Province, Turkey